The 2011 East Hampshire District Council election took place on 5 May 2011 to elect members of East Hampshire District Council in Hampshire England. The whole council was up for election and the Conservative Party stayed in overall control of the council.

Background
The previous election in 2007 saw the Conservatives increase their majority on the council after winning 30 seats, compared to 14 for the Liberal Democrats. In 2008 the councillor for Whitehill Pinewood, Ian Dowdle, defected from the Liberal Democrats to join the Conservatives. However, in 2010 Dowdle would resign from the Conservatives over the party's handling of the local eco-town and he then resigned from the council in January 2011. A further 2 defections took place in March 2011 with Conservatives Maureen Comber and Eve Hope, representing Selborne, and Bramshott and Liphook respectively, joining the Liberal Democrats.

Election result
The results saw the Conservatives increase their majority on the council after gaining 9 seats from the Liberal Democrats compared to the 2007 election. This took the Conservatives to 39 councillors, compared to 5 Liberal Democrats, the largest majority since the founding of the council. Overall turnout in the election was 48%.

Conservatives gained 5 seats from the Liberal Democrats in Alton, including defeating the Liberal Democrat leader on the council, Jerry James, in Alton Wooteys. Other Conservative gains came in Clanfield and Finchdean, Horndean Kings, Horndean Murray and Petersfield Causeway. This left the Liberal Democrats with just 5 councillors, all in the Whitehill and Bordon area.

The Conservatives leader of the council Patrick Burridge described the results as "beyond my wildest dreams". Meanwhile, the new Liberal Democrat leader on the council Adam Carew put their defeats down to high Conservative turnout in the Alternative Vote referendum which was held at the same time as the council election and that the "low popularity rating" of the national Liberal Democrat leader Nick Clegg "had a negative effect".

5 Conservative candidates were unopposed at the election. Seat changes are compared to the 2007 election and do not take into account defections.

Ward results

Alton Amery

Alton Ashdell

Alton Eastbrooke

Alton Westbrooke

Alton Whitedown

Alton Wooteys

Binstead and Bentley

Bramshott and Liphook

Clanfield and Finchdean

Downland

East Meon

Four Marks and Medstead

Froxfield and Steep

Grayshott

Headley

Holybourne and Froyle

Horndean, Catherington and Lovedean

Horndean Downs

Horndean, Hazleton and Blendworth

Horndean Kings

Horndean Murray

Lindford

Liss

Petersfield Bell Hill

Petersfield Causeway

Petersfield Heath

Petersfield Rother

Petersfield St Mary's

Petersfield St Peter

Ropley and Tisted

Rowlands Castle

Selborne

The Hangers and Forest

Whitehill Chase

Whitehill Deadwater

Whitehill Hogmoor

Whitehill Pinewood

Whitehill Walldown

References

2011
2011 English local elections
2010s in Hampshire